Gabriela Elizabeth Medina Solórzano (born 3 March 1985 in Guadalajara, Jalisco) is a Mexican sprinter who specializes in the 400 metres.

Personal bests
Her personal best time is 51.25 seconds, achieved in May 2007 in Xalapa.

Achievements

References

External links

1985 births
Living people
Mexican female sprinters
Mexican female middle-distance runners
Sportspeople from Guadalajara, Jalisco
Athletes (track and field) at the 2007 Pan American Games
Athletes (track and field) at the 2008 Summer Olympics
Athletes (track and field) at the 2011 Pan American Games
Olympic athletes of Mexico
Pan American Games silver medalists for Mexico
Pan American Games medalists in athletics (track and field)
World Athletics Championships athletes for Mexico
Central American and Caribbean Games gold medalists for Mexico
Central American and Caribbean Games silver medalists for Mexico
Central American and Caribbean Games bronze medalists for Mexico
Competitors at the 2002 Central American and Caribbean Games
Competitors at the 2006 Central American and Caribbean Games
Competitors at the 2010 Central American and Caribbean Games
Competitors at the 2014 Central American and Caribbean Games
Central American and Caribbean Games medalists in athletics
Medalists at the 2011 Pan American Games
Olympic female sprinters
21st-century Mexican women